Selknam is a professional rugby union team based in Santiago, Chile. The team was founded in 2019 to compete in Súper Liga Americana de Rugby.

Stadium
Selknam's home stadium has not been formally announced yet but it is expected they will play at the home of the Chile national team; Estadio Santiago Bueras. with the squad training at CAR Feruchi Rugby as of mid-January On 2 March 2020 it was confirmed that Selknam will play the opening game of the 2020 season at the Estadio Nacional Julio Martínez Prádanos.

Current squad 
The Selknam squad for the 2023 Super Rugby Americas season is:

 Senior 15s internationally capped players are listed in bold.

References

External links
 

Chilean rugby union teams
Sport in Santiago
Rugby clubs established in 2019
2019 establishments in Chile
Super Rugby Americas